This is a list of Swedish film directors. It includes some foreign-born film directors who have worked in Sweden.

A
Lasse Åberg
Mac Ahlberg
Per Åhlin
Marianne Ahrne
Jonas Åkerlund
Daniel Alfredson
Hans Alfredson
Tomas Alfredson
Roy Andersson

B
Anders Banke
Daniel Bergman
Eva Bergman
Ingmar Bergman

C
Nils Olaf Chrisander
Peter Cohen

D
Tage Danielsson

E
Viking Eggeling
Lena Einhorn
Hasse Ekman
Marie-Louise Ekman
Daniel Espinosa

F
Josef Fares
Daniel Fridell

G
Kjell Grede

H
Mikael Håfström
Lasse Hallström
Geir Hansteen Jörgensen
Klaus Härö
Olle Hellbom
Richard Hobert
Anna Hofman-Uddgren

J
Stefan Jarl

L
Daniel Lind Lagerlöf
Ella Lemhagen
Gunnel Lindblom
Lars-Magnus Lindgren
Ebba Lindkvist (1882–1942), Sweden's first female film director
Oscar A.C. Lund

M
Ulf Malmros
Arne Mattsson
Gustaf Molander
Lukas Moodysson

N
Colin Nutley
Sven Nykvist

O
Stig Olin
Ruben Östlund

P
Reza Parsa
Kay Pollak

R
Björn Runge

S
Alf Sjöberg
Vilgot Sjöman
Victor Sjöström
Johan Söderberg
Kristofer Steen
Mauritz Stiller
Arne Sucksdorff
Kjell Sundvall

T
Filip Tegstedt
Jan Troell

V
 Bo Arne Vibenius

W
Maj Wechselmann
Bo Widerberg

Z
Mai Zetterling

See also
Cinema of Sweden

Film directors
Sweden